Below is a sortable list of compositions by Jean Françaix.  The works are categorized by genre, date of composition and titles.

Scores by Françaix are published mainly by Schott Music, Éditions Transatlantiques, Éditions Max Eschig and Éditions Gérard Billaudot.

External links
 Jean Françaix list of works 
 Jean Françaix list of works 

Francaix